Gdynia is a city in northern Poland and a seaport on the Baltic Sea coast. With a population of 243,918, it is the 12th-largest city in Poland and the second-largest in the Pomeranian Voivodeship after Gdańsk. Gdynia is part of a conurbation with the spa town of Sopot, the city of Gdańsk, and suburban communities, which together form a metropolitan area called  the Tricity (Trójmiasto) with around 1,500,000 inhabitants.

Historically and culturally part of Kashubia and Eastern Pomerania, Gdynia for centuries remained a small fishing village. By the 20th-century it attracted visitors as a seaside resort town. In 1926, Gdynia was granted city rights after which it enjoyed demographic and urban development, with a modernist cityscape. It became a major seaport city of Poland. In 1970, protests in and around Gdynia contributed to the rise of the Solidarity movement in nearby Gdańsk.

The port of Gdynia is a regular stopover on the cruising itinerary of luxury passenger ships and ferries travelling to Scandinavia. Gdynia's downtown, designated a historical monument of Poland in 2015, is an example of building an integrated European community and includes Functionalist architectural forms. Its axis is based around 10 Lutego Street and connects the main train station with the Southern Pier. The city is also known for holding the annual Gdynia Film Festival. In 2013, Gdynia was ranked by readers of The News as Poland's best city to live in, and topped the national rankings in the category of "general quality of life". In 2021, the city entered the UNESCO Creative Cities Network and was named UNESCO City of Film.

History

Early history

The area of the later city of Gdynia shared its history with Pomerelia (Eastern Pomerania). In prehistoric times, it was the center of Oksywie culture; it was later populated by Slavs with some Baltic Prussian influences. In the late 10th century, the region was united with the emerging state of Poland by its first historic ruler Mieszko I. During the reign of Bolesław II, the region seceded from Poland and became independent, to be reunited with Poland in 1116/1121 by Bolesław III. In 1209, the present-day district of Oksywie was first mentioned (Oxhöft). Following the fragmentation of Poland, the region became part of the Duchy of Pomerania (Eastern), which became separate from Poland in 1227, to be reunited in 1282. The first known mention of the name "Gdynia", as a Pomeranian (Kashubian) fishing village dates back to 1253. The first church on this part of the Baltic Sea coast was built there. In 1309–1310, the Teutonic Order invaded and annexed the region from Poland. In 1380, the owner of the village which became Gdynia, Peter from Rusocin, gave the village to the Cistercian Order. In 1382, Gdynia became property of the Cistercian abbey in Oliwa. In 1454, King Casimir IV Jagiellon signed the act of reincorporation of the region to the Kingdom of Poland, and the Thirteen Years' War, the longest of all Polish-Teutonic wars, started. It ended in 1466, when the Teutonic Knights recognized the region as part of Poland. Administratively, Gdynia was located in the Pomeranian Voivodeship in the province of Royal Prussia in the Greater Poland Province of the Kingdom of Poland and later of the Polish–Lithuanian Commonwealth. The present-day neighbourhood of Kolibki was the location of the Kolibki estate, purchased by King John III Sobieski in 1685.

In 1772, Gdynia was annexed by the Kingdom of Prussia in the First Partition of Poland. Gdynia, under the Germanized name Gdingen, was included within the newly formed province of West Prussia and was expropriated from the Cistercian Order. In 1789, there were only 21 houses in Gdynia. Around that time Gdynia was so small that it was not marked on many maps of the period: it was about halfway from Oksywie and Mały Kack, now districts of Gdynia. In 1871, the village became part of the German Empire. In the early 20th century Gdynia was not a poor fishing village as it is sometimes described; it had become a popular tourist spot with several guest houses, restaurants, cafés, several brick houses and a small harbour with a pier for small trading ships. The first Kashubian mayor was Jan Radtke. It is estimated that around 1910 the population of Gdynia was 895 people.

Following World War I, in 1918, Poland regained independence, and following the Treaty of Versailles, in 1920, Gdynia was re-integrated with the reborn Polish state. Simultaneously, the nearby city of Gdańsk (Danzig) and surrounding area was declared a free city and put under the League of Nations, though Poland was given economic liberties and requisitioned for matters of foreign representation.

Construction of the seaport 

The decision to build a major seaport at Gdynia village was made by the Polish government in winter 1920, in the midst of the Polish–Soviet War (1919–1920). The authorities and seaport workers of the Free City of Danzig felt Poland's economic rights in the city were being misappropriated to help fight the war. German dockworkers went on strike, refusing to unload shipments of military supplies sent from the West to aid the Polish army, and Poland realized the need for a port city it was in complete control of, economically and politically.

Construction of Gdynia seaport started in 1921 but, because of financial difficulties, it was conducted slowly and with interruptions. It was accelerated after the Sejm (Polish parliament) passed the Gdynia Seaport Construction Act on 23 September 1922. By 1923 a 550-metre pier,  of a wooden tide breaker, and a small harbour had been constructed. Ceremonial inauguration of Gdynia as a temporary military port and fishers' shelter took place on 23 April 1923. The first major seagoing ship, the French Line steamer Kentucky, arrived on 13 August 1923 after being diverted because of a strike at Gdansk.  

To speed up the construction works, the Polish government in November 1924 signed a contract with the French-Polish Consortium for Gdynia Seaport Construction. By the end of 1925, they had built a small seven-metre-deep harbour, the south pier, part of the north pier, a railway, and had ordered the trans-shipment equipment. The works were going more slowly than expected, however. They accelerated only after May 1926, because of an increase in Polish exports by sea, economic prosperity, the outbreak of the German–Polish trade war which reverted most Polish international trade to sea routes, and thanks to the personal engagement of Eugeniusz Kwiatkowski, Polish Minister of Industry and Trade (also responsible for the construction of Centralny Okręg Przemysłowy). By the end of 1930 docks, piers, breakwaters, and many auxiliary and industrial installations were constructed (such as depots, trans-shipment equipment, and a rice processing factory) or started (such as a large cold store).

Trans-shipments rose from 10,000 tons (1924) to 2,923,000 tons (1929). At this time Gdynia was the only transit and special seaport designed for coal exports.

In the years 1931–1939 Gdynia harbour was further extended to become a universal seaport. In 1938 Gdynia was the largest and most modern seaport on the Baltic Sea, as well as the tenth biggest in Europe. The trans-shipments rose to 8.7 million tons, which was 46% of Polish foreign trade. In 1938 the Gdynia shipyard started to build its first full-sea ship, the Olza.

Construction of the city 
The city was constructed later than the seaport. In 1925 a special committee was inaugurated to build the city; city expansion plans were designed and city rights were granted in 1926, and tax privileges were granted for investors in 1927. The city started to grow significantly after 1928.

A new railway station and the Post Office were completed. The State railways extended their lines, built bridges and also constructed a group of houses for their employees. Public institutions and private employers helped their staff to build houses.
In 1933 a plan of development providing for a population of 250,000 was worked out by a special commission appointed by a government committee, in collaboration with the municipal authorities. By 1939 the population had grown to over 120,000.

Gdynia during World War II (1939–1945) 

During the German invasion of Poland, which started World War II in September 1939, Gdynia was the site of fierce Polish defense. On 13 September 1939, the Germans carried out first arrests of local Poles in the southern part of the city, while the Polish defense was still ongoing in the northern part. On 14 September 1939, the Germans captured the entire city, and then occupied it until 1945. On 15–16 September, the Germans carried out further mass arrests of 7,000 Poles, while Polish soldiers still fought in nearby Kępa Oksywska. The German police surrounded the city and carried out mass searches of weapons. Arrested Poles were held and interrogated in churches, cinemas and halls, and then around 3,000 people were released until 18 September. The occupiers established several prisons and camps for Polish people, who were afterwards either deported to concentration camps or executed. Some Poles from Gdynia were executed by the Germans near Starogard Gdański in September 1939. In October and November 1939, the Germans carried out public executions of 52 Poles, including activists, bank directors and priests, in various parts of the city. In November 1939, the occupiers also murdered hundreds of Poles from Gdynia during the massacres in Piaśnica committed nearby as part of the Intelligenzaktion. Among the victims were policemen, officials, civil defenders of Gdynia, judges, court employees, the director and employees of the National Bank of Poland, merchants, priests, school principals, teachers, and students of local high schools. On the night of 10–11 November, the German security police carried out mass arrests of over 1,500 Poles in the Obłuże district, and then murdered 23 young men aged 16–20, in retaliation for breaking windows at the headquarters of the German security police. On 11 November, a German gendarme shot and killed two Polish boys who were collecting Polish books from the street, which were thrown out of the windows by new German settlers in the Oksywie district. The Germans renamed the city to Gotenhafen after the Goths, an ancient Germanic tribe, who had lived in the area. 10 Poles from Gdynia were also murdered by the Russians in the large Katyn massacre in April–May 1940.

Some 50,000 Polish citizens were expelled to the General Government (German-occupied central Poland) to make space for new German settlers in accordance with the Lebensraum policy. Local Kashubians who were suspected to support the Polish cause, particularly those with higher education, were also arrested and executed. The German gauleiter Albert Forster considered Kashubians of "low value" and did not support any attempts to create a Kashubian nationality. Despite such circumstances, local Poles, including Kashubians, organized Polish resistance groups, Kashubian Griffin (later Pomeranian Griffin), the exiled "Związek Pomorski" in the United Kingdom, and local units of the Home Army, Service for Poland's Victory and Gray Ranks. Activities included distribution of underground Polish press, smuggling data on German persecution of Poles and Jews to Western Europe, sabotage actions, espionage of the local German industry, and facilitating escapes of endangered Polish resistance members and British and French prisoners of war who fled from German POW camps via the city's port to neutral Sweden. The Gestapo cracked down on the Polish resistance several times, with the Poles either killed or deported to the Stutthof and Ravensbrück concentration camps. In 1943, local Poles managed to save some kidnapped Polish children from the Zamość region, by buying them from the Germans at the local train station.

The harbour was transformed into a German naval base. The shipyard was expanded in 1940 and became a branch of the Kiel shipyard (Deutsche Werke Kiel A.G.). The city became an important base, due to its being relatively distant from the war theater, and many German large ships—battleships and heavy cruisers—were anchored there.

The Germans set up an Einsatzgruppen-operated penal camp in the Grabówek district, a transit camp for Allied marine POWs, and two subcamps of the Stutthof concentration camp, the first located in the Orłowo district in 1941–1942, the second, named Gotenhafen, located at the shipyard in 1944–1945.

The seaport and the shipyard both witnessed several air raids by the Allies from 1943 onwards, but suffered little damage. Gdynia was used during winter 1944–45 to evacuate German troops and refugees trapped by the Red Army. Some of the ships were hit by torpedoes from Soviet submarines in the Baltic Sea on the route west. The ship  sank, taking about 9,400 people with her – the worst loss of life in a single sinking in maritime history. The seaport area was largely destroyed by withdrawing German troops and millions of encircled refugees in 1945 being bombarded by the Soviet military (90% of the buildings and equipment were destroyed) and the harbour entrance was blocked by the German battleship  that had been brought to Gotenhafen for major repairs.

After World War II 

On 28 March 1945, the city was captured by the Soviets and restored to Poland. The Soviets installed a communist regime, which stayed in power until the Fall of Communism in the 1989. The post-war period saw an influx of settlers from Warsaw which was destroyed by Germany, and other parts of the country as well as Poles from the cities of Wilno (now Vilnius) and Lwów (now Lviv) from the Soviet-annexed former eastern Poland. Also Greeks, refugees of the Greek Civil War, settled in the city. The port of Gdynia was one of the three Polish ports through which refugees of the Greek Civil War reached Poland.

On December 17, 1970, worker demonstrations took place at Gdynia Shipyard. Workers were fired upon by the police. Janek Wiśniewski was one of 40 killed, and was commemorated in a song by Mieczysław Cholewa, Pieśń o Janku z Gdyni. One of Gdynia's important streets is named after Janek Wiśniewski. The event was also portrayed in Andrzej Wajda's movie Man of Iron.

On 4 December 1999, a storm destroyed a huge crane in a shipyard.

Geography

Climate 
The climate of Gdynia is an oceanic climate owing to its position of the Baltic Sea, which moderates the temperatures, compared to the interior of Poland. The climate is cool throughout the year and there is a somewhat uniform precipitation throughout the year. Typical of Northern Europe, there is little sunshine during the year. Because of its northerly latitude, Gdynia has 17 hours of daylight in midsummer but only around 7 hours in midwinter.

Districts
Gdynia is divided into smaller divisions: dzielnicas and osiedles. Gdynia's dzielnicas include: Babie Doły, Chwarzno-Wiczlino, Chylonia, Cisowa, Dąbrowa, Działki Leśne, Grabówek, Kamienna Góra, Karwiny, Leszczynki, Mały Kack, Obłuże, Oksywie, Orłowo, Pogórze, Pustki Cisowskie-Demptowo, Redłowo, Śródmieście, Wielki Kack, Witomino-Leśniczówka, Witomino-Radiostacja, Wzgórze Św. Maksymiliana.

Osiedles: Bernadowo, Brzozowa Góra, Chwarzno, Dąbrówka, Demptowo, Dębowa Góra, Fikakowo, Gołębiewo, Kacze Buki, Kolibki, Kolonia Chwaszczyno, Kolonia Rybacka, Krykulec, Marszewo, Międzytorze, Niemotowo, Osada Kolejowa, Osada Rybacka, Osiedle Bernadowo, Port, Pustki Cisowskie, Tasza, Wiczlino, Wielka Rola, Witomino, Wysoka, Zielenisz.

Cityscape 

Gdynia is a relatively modern city. Its architecture includes the 13th century St. Michael the Archangel's Church in Oksywie, the oldest building in Gdynia, and the 17th century neo-Gothic manor house located on Folwarczna Street in Orłowo.

The surrounding hills and the coastline attract many nature lovers. A leisure pier and a cliff-like coastline in Kępa Redłowska, as well as the surrounding Nature Reserve, are also popular locations. In the harbour, there are two anchored museum ships, the destroyer  and the tall ship frigate Dar Pomorza. A -long promenade leads from the marina in the city center, to the beach in Redłowo.

Most of Gdynia can be seen from Kamienna Góra ( asl) or the viewing point near Chwaszczyno. There are also two viewing towers, one at Góra Donas, the other at Kolibki.

In 2015 the Emigration Museum opened in the city. Other museums include the Gdynia Aquarium, Experyment Science Center, Abraham's house, Żeromski's house, Gdynia Automotive Museum, Naval Museum, and Gdynia City Museum.

Modernist Center 
Gdynia holds many examples of early 20th-century architecture, especially monumentalism and early functionalism, and modernism. Historic Urban Layout of the City Center was drafted by Adam Kuncewicz and Roman Feliński in 1926. The central axis of Gdynia is built around 10 Lutego Street, Kosciuszka Square and the Southern Pier. The structure of the city is designed to emphasize the connection of Gdynia and Poland with the Baltic Sea.  Examples of modernist architecture are the buildings of the Bank of Poland and many tenement houses (kamienice). Another good example of modernism is PLO Building situated at 10 Lutego Street.

The architecture of central Gdynia was inspired by the work of European architects such as Erich Mendelssohn and is sometimes compared to the White City of Tel Aviv. The center of Gdynia has become a symbol of modernity, but was included in the list of historical monuments of Poland and is a candidate for the UNESCO World Heritage List.

Culture 

Gdynia hosts the Gdynia Film Festival, the main Polish film festival. The International Random Film Festival was hosted in Gdynia in November 2014.
Since 2003 Gdynia has been hosting the Open'er Festival, one of the biggest contemporary music festivals in Europe. The festival welcomes many foreign hip-hop, rock and electronic music artists every year. In record-high 2018 it was attended by over 140,000 people, who enjoyed the lineup headlined by Bruno Mars, Gorillaz, Arctic Monkeys, and Depeche Mode.
Another important summer event in Gdynia is the Viva Beach Party, which is a large two-day techno party made on Gdynia's Public Beach and a summer-welcoming concerts CudaWianki. Gdynia also hosts events for the annual Gdańsk Shakespeare Festival.
In the summer of 2014 Gdynia hosted Red Bull Air Race World Championship.

Cultural references 
In 2008, Gdynia made it onto the Monopoly Here and Now World Edition board after being voted by fans through the Internet. Gdynia occupies the space traditionally held by Mediterranean Avenue, being the lowest voted city to make it onto the Monopoly Here and Now board, but also the smallest city to make it in the game. All of the other cities are large and widely known ones, the second smallest being Riga. The unexpected success of Gdynia can be attributed to a mobilization of the town's population to vote for it on the Internet.

An abandoned factory district in Gdynia was the scene for the survival series Man vs Wild, season 6, episode 12. The host, Bear Grylls, manages to escape the district after blowing up a door and crawling through miles of sewer.

Ernst Stavro Blofeld, the supervillain in the James Bond novels, was born in Gdynia on 28 May 1908, according to Thunderball.

Gdynia is sometimes called "Polish Roswell" due to the alleged UFO crash on 21 January 1959.

Notable people 

 Stanisław Baranowski (1935–1978), glaciologist, undertook scientific expeditions to Spitsbergen and Antarctica. 
 Karol Olgierd Borchardt (1905–1986), writer and captain of the Polish Merchant Marine
 Krzysztof Charamsa (born 1972), former Catholic theologian and author
 Adam Darski (born 1977), musician and TV personality, frontman for the blackened death metal band Behemoth 
 Wiesław Dawidowski (born 1964), Augustinian Catholic priest, doctor of theology and journalist
 Rafał de Weryha-Wysoczański (born 1975), art historian, genealogist and writer
 Jacek Fedorowicz (born 1937), satirist and actor
 Tova Friedman (born 1938), therapist, social worker, author and Holocaust survivor
 Eugeniusz Geno Małkowski (1942–2016), painter
 Gunnar Heinsohn (born 1943), German author, sociologist and economist
 Klaus Hurrelmann (born 1944), Professor of Public Health and Education
 Hilary Jastak (1914–2000 in Gdynia), Catholic priest, Doctor of Theology, Chaplain of Solidarity movement, Major of Polish Armed Forces, Lieutenant Commander of the Polish Navy
 Janusz Kaczmarek (born 1961), lawyer, prosecutor and politician
 Marcin Kupinski (born 1983), ballet dancer
 Tomasz Makowiecki (born 1983), musician, singer and songwriter
 Dorota Nieznalska (born 1973), visual artist and sculptor
 Kazimierz Ostrowski (1917–1999 in Gdynia), painter
 Anna Przybylska (1978–2014), actress and model
 Zvi Aryeh Rosenfeld (1922–1978), Polish-American rabbi and educator
 Jerzy Rubach (born 1948), Polish and American linguist who specializes in phonology
 Arkadiusz Rybicki (1953–2010), politician, active in the Solidarity movement
 Joanna Senyszyn (born 1949), left-wing politician, vice-president of the Democratic Left Alliance (SLD) and MEP
 Anna Siewierska (1955-2011), Polish-born linguist, specialist in language typology 
 Wojciech Szczurek (born 1963), Mayor of the City of Gdynia since 1998
 Józef Unrug (1884–1973), German-born Polish vice admiral who helped create the Polish navy
 Marian Zacharski (born 1951), Intelligence officer convicted of espionage
 Marek Żukowski (born 1952), theoretical physicist, specializes in quantum mechanics

Sport 

 Jörg Berger (1944–2010), German soccer player, trainer
 Adelajda Mroske (1944–1975), speed skater, she competed in four events at the 1964 Winter Olympics
 Ryszard Marczak (born 1945), former long-distance runner from Poland, competed in the marathon at the 1980 Summer Olympics
 Józef Błaszczyk (born 1947), sailor who competed in the 1972 Summer Olympics
 Andrzej Chudziński (1948–1995), swimmer, competed in three events at the 1972 Summer Olympics
 Anna Sobczak (born 1967), fencer, competed in the women's individual and team foil events at the 1988 and 1992 Summer Olympics 
 Tomasz Sokołowski (born 1970), footballer, over 350 pro games and 12 for Poland
 Jarosław Rodzewicz (born 1973), fencer, won a silver medal in the team foil event at the 1996 Summer Olympics
 Marcin Mięciel (born 1975), soccer player, over 500 pro games
 Michael Klim (born 1977), Polish-born Australian swimmer, Olympic gold medallist and world champion
 Anna Rybicka (born 1977), fencer, she won a silver medal in the women's team foil event at the 2000 Summer Olympics
 Andrzej Bledzewski (born 1977), retired football goalkeeper, over 400 pro games
 Tomasz Dawidowski (born 1978), footballer, over 200 pro games and 10 for Poland
 Maciej Grabowski (born 1978), laser class sailor, competed in the 2000, 2004 and 2008 Summer Olympics
 Adriana Dadci (born 1979), judoka, competed at the 2004 Summer Olympics
 Stefan Liv (1980–2011), Polish-born Swedish professional ice hockey goaltender
 Monika Pyrek (born 1980), retired pole vaulter, competed at the 2000, 2004 2008 and 2012 Summer Olympics
 Anna Rogowska (born 1981), pole vaulter, the bronze medallist at the 2004 Summer Olympics
 Michał Zych (born 1982), ice dancer
 Karolina Chlewińska (born 1983), foil fencer, competed at the 2008 Summer Olympics
  Igor Janik (born 1983), javelin thrower, competed in the 2008 and 2012 Summer Olympics
 Klaudia Jans-Ignacik (born 1984), retired tennis player, competed in the 2008 and 2012 Summer Olympics 
 Piotr Hallmann (born 1987), mixed martial artist, second lieutenant in the Polish Navy
 Joanna Mitrosz (born 1988), rhythmic gymnast, competed at the 2008 and 2012 Summer Olympics
 Małgorzata Białecka (born 1988), windsurfer, competed at 2016 Summer Olympics
 Olek Czyż (born 1990), professional basketball player, played for Poland
 Justyna Plutowska (born 1991), ice dancer

Fictional characters
 Ernst Stavro Blofeld (born 28 May 1908 in Gdingen), fictional character and villain from the James Bond series of novels and films, created by Ian Fleming

Sports 

         Sport teams
 Arka Gdynia – men's football team (Polish Cup winner 1979 and 2017, Polish SuperCup winner in 2017 and in 2018. Currently plays in the first division of Polish football, the Ekstraklasa)
 Bałtyk Gdynia – men's football team, currently playing in Polish 4th division
 Arka Gdynia (basketball) – men's basketball team (9 time Polish Basketball League winner)
 Arka Gdynia (women's basketball) – women's basketball team (12-time Basket Liga Kobiet champion)
 RC Arka Gdynia – rugby team (4-time Polish Champions)
 Seahawks Gdynia – American football team (Polish American Football League) (4-time champion of Poland in 2012, 2014 and in 2015)
 Arka Gdynia (handball) – handball team which plays in Ekstraliga (First division of Polish handball)

International events 

2017 UEFA European Under-21 Championship
2019 FIFA U-20 World Cup
2020 World Athletics Half Marathon Championships

Economy and infrastructure 

Notable companies that have their headquarters or regional offices in Gdynia:
 PROKOM SA – the largest Polish I.T. company
 C. Hartwig Gdynia SA – one of the largest Polish freight forwarders
 Sony Pictures – finance center
 Thomson Reuters – business data provider
 Vistal – bridge constructions, offshore and shipbuilding markets; partially located on old Stocznia Gdynia terrains
 Nauta – ship repair yard; partially located on old Stocznia Gdynia terrains
 Crist – shipbuilding, offshore constructions, steel structures, sea engineering, civil engineering; located on old Stocznia Gdynia terrains

Former:
 Stocznia Gdynia – former largest Polish shipyard, now under bankruptcy procedures
 Nordea – banks, sold and consolidated with PKO bank

Transport

Port of Gdynia 

In 2007, 364,202 passengers, 17,025,000 tons of cargo and  containers passed through the port. Regular car ferry service operates between Gdynia and Karlskrona, Sweden.

Airport 
It is the third largest airport in Poland. A second General Aviation terminal was scheduled to be opened by May 2012, which will increase the airport's capacity to 5mln passengers per year.

Another local airport, (Gdynia-Kosakowo Airport) is situated partly in the village of Kosakowo, just to the north of the city, and partly in Gdynia. This has been a military airport since the World War II, but it has been decided in 2006 that the airport will be used to serve civilians. Work was well in progress and was due to be ready for 2012 when the project collapsed following a February 2014 EU decision regarding Gdynia city funding as constituting unfair competition to Gdańsk airport. In March 2014, the airport management company filed for bankruptcy, this being formally announced in May that year. The fate of some PLN 100 million of public funds from Gdynia remain unaccounted for with documents not being released, despite repeated requests for such from residents to the city president, Wojciech Szczurek.

Road transport 
Trasa Kwiatkowskiego links Port of Gdynia and the city with Obwodnica Trójmiejska, and therefore A1 motorway. National road 6 connects Tricity with Słupsk, Koszalin and Szczecin agglomeration.

Railways 
The principal station in Gdynia is Gdynia Główna railway station, the busiest railway station in the Tricity and northern Poland and seventh busiest in Poland overall (as of 2021), and Gdynia has eight other railway stations. Local services are provided by the 'Fast Urban Railway,' Szybka Kolej Miejska (Tricity) operating frequent trains covering the Tricity area including Gdańsk, Sopot and Gdynia. Long-distance trains from Warsaw via Gdańsk terminate at Gdynia, and there are direct trains to Szczecin, Poznań, Katowice, Lublin and other major cities. In December 2014 new Alstom Pendolino high-speed trains were put into service between Gdynia, Warsaw and Kraków reducing rail travel times to Gdynia by 2 hours.

Education 

There are currently 8 universities and institutions of higher education based in Gdynia. Many students from Gdynia also attend universities located in the Tricity.

 State-owned:
 Gdynia Maritime University
 Polish Naval Academy
 Privately owned:
WSB Universities – WSB University in Gdańsk, departments of Economics and Management
 Academy of International Economic and Political Relations
 University of Business and Administration in Gdynia
 Pomeranian Higher School of Humanities
 Cardinal Stefan Wyszyński University – department in Gdynia
 Higher School of Social Communication

Twin towns – sister cities

Gdynia is twinned with:

 Aalborg, Denmark
 Baranavichy, Belarus
 Brooklyn (New York), United States
 Côte d'Opale (communauté), France
 Haikou, China
 Karlskrona, Sweden
 Kiel, Germany
 Klaipėda, Lithuania
 Kotka, Finland
 Kristiansand, Norway
 Kunda (Viru-Nigula), Estonia
 Liepāja, Latvia
 Plymouth, England, United Kingdom
 Seattle, United States

Former twin towns:
 Kaliningrad, Russia (terminated in 2022 due to the Russian invasion of Ukraine)

See also 

 Gdynia trolleybus
 Ports of the Baltic Sea
 St. Anthony parish, Gdynia
 Wiczlino, Gdynia

Notes

References

Further reading 
 (ed.) R. Wapiński, Dzieje Gdyni, Gdańsk 1980
 (ed.). S. Gierszewski, Gdynia, Gdańsk 1968
 Gdynia, in: Pomorze Gdańskie, nr 5, Gdańsk 1968
 J. Borowik, Gdynia, port Rzeczypospolitej, Toruń 1934
 B. Kasprowicz, Problemy ekonomiczne budowy i eksploatacji portu w Gdyni w latach 1920–1939, Zapiski Historyczne, nr 1-3/1956
 M. Widernik, Główne problemy gospodarczo-społeczne miasta Gdyni w latach 1926–1939., Gdańsk 1970
 (ed.) A. Bukowski, Gdynia. Sylwetki ludzi, oświata i nauka, literatura i kultura, Gdańsk 1979
 Gminy województwa gdańskiego, Gdańsk 1995
 H. Górnowicz, Z. Brocki, Nazwy miast Pomorza Gdańskiego, Wrocław 1978
 Gerard Labuda (ed.), Historia Pomorza, vol. I-IV, Poznań 1969–2003
 (ed.) W. Odyniec, Dzieje Pomorza Nadwiślańskiego od VII wieku do 1945 roku, Gdańsk 1978
 L. Bądkowski, Pomorska myśl polityczna, Gdańsk 1990
 L. Bądkowski, W. Samp, Poczet książąt Pomorza Gdańskiego, Gdańsk 1974
 B. Śliwiński, Poczet książąt gdańskich, Gdańsk 1997
 Józef Spors, Podziały administracyjne Pomorza Gdańskiego i Sławieńsko-Słupskiego od XII do początków XIV w, Słupsk 1983
 M. Latoszek, Pomorze. Zagadnienia etniczno-regionalne, Gdańsk 1996
 B. Bojarska, Eksterminacja inteligencji polskiej na Pomorzu Gdańskim (wrzesień-grudzień 1939), Poznań 1972
 K. Ciechanowski, Ruch oporu na Pomorzu Gdańskim 1939–1945., Warszawa 1972

External links 

 Gdynia Port - Home for all Polish Ocean Liners
 Gdynia city website
 Virtual tour on Gdynia's coast
 Gdynia tourist guide
 Gdynia Tripadvisor

 
Planned cities in Poland
Port cities and towns in Poland
Port cities and towns of the Baltic Sea
1926 in Poland
City counties of Poland
Cities and towns in Pomeranian Voivodeship
Pomeranian Voivodeship (1919–1939)
Marinas in Poland
Nazi war crimes in Poland
UFO sightings